The Lulu McCormick Junior High School at 2001 Capitol Ave. in Cheyenne, Wyoming was built in 1929.  It was a work of Frederick Hutchinson Porter.  It has also been known as Emerson Building.  It was listed on the National Register of Historic Places in 2005.

References

School buildings on the National Register of Historic Places in Wyoming
Gothic Revival architecture in Wyoming
School buildings completed in 1929
Buildings and structures in Cheyenne, Wyoming
National Register of Historic Places in Cheyenne, Wyoming
1929 establishments in Wyoming